Laingsburg is a city in Shiawassee County in the U.S. state of Michigan. The population was 1,283 at the 2010 census.

It is mostly surrounded by Sciota Township with a small western border with Victor Township in Clinton County. The Laingsburg 48848 ZIP Code covers a much larger area that also includes parts of Sleepy Hollow State Park and Lake Ovid to the northeast.    
Laingsburg was named for Dr. Peter Laing, who operated a local tavern.

Geography

Laingsburg is located in proximity to the Rose Lake State Wildlife Research Area and Sleepy Hollow State Park. Laingsburg has posted exits on U.S. Route 127 to the west and Interstate 69 to the south.

Demographics

2010 census
As of the census of 2010, there were 1,283 people, 463 households, and 335 families living in the city. The racial makeup of the city was 96.6% White, 0.4% African American, 0.4% Native American, 0.4% Asian, 0.3% from other races, and 1.9% from two or more races. Hispanic or Latino of any race were 1.4% of the population.

There were 463 households, of which 44.7% had children under the age of 18 living with them, 49.5% were married couples living together, 15.8% had a female householder with no husband present, 7.1% had a male householder with no wife present, and 27.6% were non-families. 24.2% of all households were made up of individuals, and 9.3% had someone living alone who was 65 years of age or older. The average household size was 2.77 and the average family size was 3.24.

The median age in the city was 33.3 years. 31.6% of residents were under the age of 18; 8.9% were between the ages of 18 and 24; 27.9% were from 25 to 44; 22.1% were from 45 to 64; and 9.5% were 65 years of age or older. The gender makeup of the city was 50.3% male and 49.7% female.

2000 census
As of the census of 2000, there were 1,223 people, 441 households, and 324 families living in the city. The racial makeup of the city was 98.04% White, 0.16% African American, 0.16% Native American, 0.16% Asian, 0.41% from other races, and 1.06% from two or more races. Hispanic or Latino of any race were 0.74% of the population.

There were 441 households, out of which 41.0% had children under the age of 18 living with them, 58.5% were married couples living together, 10.7% had a female householder with no husband present, and 26.5% were non-families. 22.4% of all households were made up of individuals, and 11.6% had someone living alone who was 65 years of age or older.  The average household size was 2.77 and the average family size was 3.25.

In the city, the population was spread out, with 31.2% under the age of 18, 8.8% from 18 to 24, 31.0% from 25 to 44, 18.0% from 45 to 64, and 11.0% who were 65 years of age or older.  The median age was 32 years. For every 100 females, there were 100.8 males.  For every 100 females age 18 and over, there were 97.2 males.

The median income for an individual in the city was $39,063, and the median income for a family was $47,656. Males had a median income of $33,889 versus $24,000 for females. The per capita income for the city was $16,083.  About 5.3% of families and 6.7% of the population were below the poverty line, including 6.5% of those under age 18 and 7.0% of those age 65 or over.

References

External links
 City of Laingsburg
 Laingsburg Community Schools
 Laingsburg Business & Community Association
 LaingsburgNews.com
 Laingsburg Lions Club

Cities in Shiawassee County, Michigan
Populated places established in 1871
1871 establishments in Michigan